Jacaratia mexicana (also known as bonete or K'uun che) is a species of tree, in the genus Jacaratia of the family Caricaceae. it is found in the tropical dry forests of central and southern Mexico, Nicaragua, and El Salvador.

External links
 Leafless Jacaratias
 Jacaratia mexicana at oncampus.richmong.edu.
 Jacaratia mexicana at www.uniprot.org.

Caricaceae
Trees of Mexico
Trees of Guatemala
Tropical fruit